Roger Gordon Frude (19 November 1946 – 14 June 1996) was an English professional footballer who played as an inside forward in the Football League for Bristol Rovers, Mansfield Town and Brentford.

Personal life 
When he died in 1996, Frude's ashes were scattered at Eastville Stadium.

Career statistics

References

1946 births
1996 deaths
Footballers from Plymouth, Devon
English footballers
Association football inside forwards
England youth international footballers
Bristol Rovers F.C. players
Mansfield Town F.C. players
Brentford F.C. players
Falmouth Town A.F.C. players
Tavistock A.F.C. players
English Football League players